Hillview is a housing estate in Waterford, Ireland. The estate is one of the largest suburban housing developments in Waterford city. The entrance to Hillview is centered on the Roanmore/De La Salle GAA pitches and Kyle Curran park; the latter being named after an 8-year-old child from Hillview who was murdered in 1987.

Lower Hillview was historically surrounded by fielded areas - including Witches Lane, the Nettle Camp and the Corn Field. Expanded development in the early 21st century, including of housing in the Grace Dieu area, saw the removal of these greenbelt areas. Hillview is divided into Oak Drive, Oak Avenue, Oak Grove, Oak Close, Pinewood Drive, Pinewood Avenue, Chestnut Green, Crescent Drive and Hawthorn Drive.

The Hillview area has previously been linked with criminal organisations in Waterford. In 2012, an investigation was carried out into the discharge of a firearm, as well as a burglary.

References

Geography of Waterford (city)